Kerstin Ubben (born 4 September 1968) is a German badminton player, born in Hamburg. 

Ubben competed in women's singles and women's doubles at the 1992 Summer Olympics in Barcelona, and in women's doubles at the 1996 Summer Olympics in Atlanta.

References

External links

1968 births
Living people
German female badminton players
Olympic badminton players of Germany
Badminton players at the 1992 Summer Olympics
Badminton players at the 1996 Summer Olympics
Sportspeople from Hamburg